Haplocochlias risoneideneryae is a species of sea snail, a marine gastropod mollusk in the family Skeneidae.

Description

Distribution
This species occurs in the Atlantic Ocean off Brazil.

References

 Bouchet, P.; Fontaine, B. (2009). List of new marine species described between 2002-2006. Census of Marine Life.

External links

risoneideneryae
Gastropods described in 2002